Sankheda is one of the 182 Legislative Assembly constituencies of Gujarat state in India. It is part of Chhota Udaipur district and is reserved for candidates belonging to the Scheduled Tribes.

List of segments
This assembly seat represents the following segments,

 Sankheda Taluka
 Nasvadi Taluka
 Nandod Taluka (Part) of Narmada District Village – Dhefa.

Members of Legislative Assembly
2012 - Dhirubhai Bhil, Indian National Congress

Election results

2022

2017

2012

See also
 List of constituencies of Gujarat Legislative Assembly
 Gujarat Legislative Assembly

References

External links
 

Assembly constituencies of Gujarat
Chhota Udaipur district